This is a comprehensive discography of official recordings by 10 Years, an American alternative metal band from Knoxville, Tennessee. 10 Years has released 9 studio albums, 20 singles.

Studio albums

Extended plays

Singles

Promotional Singles

Music videos

References

Heavy metal group discographies
Discographies of American artists